Lidia Isac (born 27 March 1993) is a Russian-born Moldovan singer. She represented Moldova in the Eurovision Song Contest 2016 with the song "Falling Stars".

Early life and education 
Isac was born on 27 March 1993 in Saint Petersburg, Russia, where her Moldovan parents met during their studies. When she was a few months old, they moved back to Moldova.

Isac graduated from the Faculty of Journalism and Communication Sciences at the Moldova State University in 2015.

Career

2013–2015: Glam Girls and solo career 
Isac began her musical career as part of the duo Glam Girls, which she formed with Sasha Druc. They finished twelfth in the final.

One year later, the duo entered  with the song "You Believed in Me", but did not advance to the final. In the same year, Isac was a finalist in the annual music competition New Wave, held in Jūrmala, Latvia. In 2015, Isac entered  twice: as part of Glam Girls with the song "", and as a solo act with the song "I Can't Breathe". Both entries advanced to the final, where they tied for the fourteenth and last place.

2016: Eurovision Song Contest 

In 2016, Isac participated in  once again, this time with the song "Falling Stars". She went on to win the competition, thereby winning the right to represent Moldova in the Eurovision Song Contest 2016 in Stockholm, Sweden. To promote her entry, an acoustic French version of the song, entitled "", was recorded. She ultimately finished in seventeenth place in the first semi-final on 10 May 2016.

2017: The Voice 
She advanced from the Blind Auditions, joining the team of Florent Pagny, and was eliminated in the Battle rounds. Later that year, she also featured in the seventh season of the Romanian version . She joined the team of Tudor Chirilă after her Blind Audition, and was eliminated in the Live Shows.

Discography

As lead artist

As part of Glam Girls

References

1993 births
Living people
21st-century Moldovan women singers
English-language singers from Moldova
Eurovision Song Contest entrants for Moldova
Eurovision Song Contest entrants of 2016
Moldova State University alumni
Moldovan women journalists
People from Chișinău
Singers from Saint Petersburg
The Voice (franchise) contestants